Martin Edward McInnis (born June 5, 1970) is an American former ice hockey player who played in the National Hockey League for the New York Islanders, Calgary Flames, Mighty Ducks of Anaheim and the Boston Bruins.  An eighth round selection of the Islanders, 163rd overall at the 1988 NHL Entry Draft, McInnis played three seasons of college hockey with the Boston College Eagles and played with the United States National Team at the 1992 Winter Olympics before turning professional. He scored 170 goals and recorded 420 points in a 12-year professional career and played in two World Championship tournaments where he was a member of the bronze medal-winning American squad in 1996.  An inductee of Boston College's Varsity Club Athletic Hall of Fame, McInnis returned to the school in 2013 as an assistant coach.

Playing career
McInnis played two seasons of high school hockey for Milton Academy in Milton, Massachusetts between 1986 and 1988 where he averaged in excess of one point per game. He was selected by the New York Islanders, 163rd overall, at the 1988 NHL Entry Draft but chose to play college hockey with the Boston College Eagles before embarking on a professional career. McInnis finished third in conference scoring in 1989–90 and tied a Hockey East record with five goals in one game in an 8–5 victory over Merrimack College on March 5, 1990. McInnis recorded 142 points in three seasons at Boston College.

Opting to remain amateur so he could play in the Olympics, McInnis spent the majority of the 1991–92 season with the United States men's national ice hockey team where he recorded 34 points in 54 games. At the 1992 Albertville Olympics, McInnis led the American team in scoring with five goals and two assists in eight games as the United States finished fourth in the tournament. McInnis turned professional following the tournament as he joined the Islanders for 15 games late in the 1991–92 NHL season where he scored three goals and five assists. He made his NHL debut on March 3, 1992, against the Montreal Canadiens and scored his first goal on March 8 against goaltender Tom Draper of the Buffalo Sabres.

After splitting the 1992–93 season between New York and the American Hockey League's Capital District Islanders, McInnis joined New York full-time for 1993–94 and led the Islanders in plus-minus at +31. His totals of 25 goals and 56 points were each the highest he would score in his career. After scoring only 16 points in the lockout-shortened 1994–95 season, McInnis finished third in team scoring with 46 points in 1995–96. Following the NHL season, he joined Team USA for the 1996 World Championship.  In seven games, McInnis recorded two assists for the bronze medal-winning Americans.  He returned for the 1997 tournament where he scored four points in a sixth-place effort by the United States.

On March 18, 1997, McInnis was traded, along with Tyrone Garner and a draft pick to the Calgary Flames in exchange for Robert Reichel. Combined between the two teams, McInnis finished the 1996–97 season with 23 goals and 49 points in 80 games. He was primarily a checking line forward and penalty killer in his only full season with the Flames, 1998–99. Six games into the 1998–99 season, McInnis was traded twice on the same day. On October 27, 1998, the Flames sent him to the Chicago Blackhawks, along with Erik Andersson and Jamie Allison, in exchange for Jeff Shantz and Steve Dubinsky.  He was then immediately sent by Chicago to the Mighty Ducks of Anaheim for a fourth round draft pick. Shortly after the trades, Chicago's general manager, Bob Murray, admitted he regretted trading McInnis so quickly, particularly after McInnis found early success on Anaheim's top scoring line as a replacement for the injured Teemu Selänne. He finished the season with 54 points, and two seasons later, scored 20 goals and 42 points for the Mighty Ducks.

Late in the 2001–02 season, Anaheim sent him to the Boston Bruins in a March 6, 2002, trade in exchange for a third round draft pick.  McInnis was excited by the deal as it afforded him the opportunity to play for his hometown team. He finished the season with 28 points in 79 games between the two teams. Following a final NHL season in 2002–03, he retired.  McInnis finished his career with 420 points in 796 games.

Boston College inducted McInnis into its Varsity Club Hall of Fame in 2012.  He returned to the school in 2013 to serve as a volunteer assistant coach.

Career statistics

Regular season and playoffs

International

References
Career statistics:

External links
 Official biography, Boston College Eagles

1970 births
Living people
American men's ice hockey left wingers
American ice hockey coaches
Boston Bruins players
Calgary Flames players
Ice hockey coaches from Massachusetts
Ice hockey players at the 1992 Winter Olympics
Mighty Ducks of Anaheim players
New York Islanders draft picks
New York Islanders players
Olympic ice hockey players of the United States
People from Hingham, Massachusetts
Sportspeople from Plymouth County, Massachusetts
Ice hockey players from Massachusetts